Porvenir is the capital of both the homonymous commune and the Chilean Province of Tierra del Fuego of the Magallanes y la Antártica Chilena Region. It is one of Chile's southernmost towns, and has 4,734 inhabitants, including several thousand soldiers. It is the largest settlement in the Chilean half of the island of Tierra del Fuego.

Porvenir (Spanish for "hereafter" – literally "yet to come") was founded in 1883 by immigrants from Croatia and Chiloé in connection to the gold mining that preceded the larger Tierra del Fuego gold rush that started in 1884.

The main sources of income are sheep farming and small-scale fishing (wrecks in Porvenir bay prevent larger vessels from mooring). In addition there is a regiment of the Chilean army and a high-security prison.  An abattoir operates for only short periods of the year.

Some gold deposits remain and are commercially mined.

Demographics

Of these, 4,734 (86.6%) lived in urban areas and 731 (13.4%) in rural areas. The population grew by 7.1% (361 persons) between the 1992 and 2002 censuses.

Administration
As a commune, Porvenir is a third-level administrative division of Chile administered by a municipal council, headed by an alcalde who is directly elected every four years. The 2016-2020 alcaldesa is Marisol Andrade Cárdenas .

Within the electoral divisions of Chile, Porvenir is represented in the Chamber of Deputies by Juan Morano (PDC) and Gabriel Boric (Ind.) as part of the 60th electoral district, which includes the entire Magallanes y la Antártica Chilena Region. The commune is represented in the Senate by Carlos Bianchi Chelech (Ind.) and Carolina Goic (PDC) as part of the 19th senatorial constituency (Magallanes y la Antártica Chilena Region).

Tourism 

Though tourism is expanding, most tourists pass Porvenir by, or use it simply as a stopover on their way farther south. There are several hotels, cyber-cafes, restaurants, and one gas station. A small grocery store is located near the Chilean army base on the upper level of the town, and there are several small stores and supermarkets elsewhere in town.

Access is by ferry or by air from Punta Arenas or by road from the Argentine side of the island. All ferries across the Straits of Magellan are run by Austral Broom, a Chilean company. One service runs once daily except Mondays from the port near Punta Arenas and reaches the ferry terminal about 3 km from the town of Porvenir. The other service is at the northern end of the island running from Punta Delgada to Bahia Azul.

It is possible to reach the south of Chilean Tierra del Fuego from Porvenir. The southern region has several lakes and rivers available for fishing.

Climate 
The climate in Porvenir is a subpolar variety (Köppen: Cfc) of the oceanic climate. Temperatures in the warmest months, January and February average 10 °C while temperatures in the coolest month average 2 °C. Precipitation is low at around 376 millimetres. Also, due to its latitude, the length of the day varies tremendously across the year. Winter days can have as few as seven hours of sunlight, while summer days stretch to twenty hours. Frost occurs throughout the year, and winter temperatures can remain below freezing for relatively long periods of time. Freak snowfalls can occur even in midsummer.

Gallery

References

External links

Cities and towns in Tierra del Fuego
Communes of Chile
Ports and harbours of Chile
Capitals of Chilean provinces
Populated places established in 1883
Populated places in Tierra del Fuego Province, Chile
Populated places in the Strait of Magellan